Gary Harvey may refer to:

 Gary Harvey (director), Canadian television director and producer
 Gary Harvey (footballer) (born 1961), English former footballer